Metzneria lappella, the burdock seedhead moth or burdock seed moth, is a moth of the family Gelechiidae.

Distribution
This species is present in most of Europe and it is widely distributed throughout the Palaearctic region, northwards to the Arctic Circle. It is an introduced species in North America, where it is found from Maine and Quebec to Florida, west to Ontario and Missouri.

Habitat
These moths mainly inhabit fields, roadsides and waste places.

Description
Metzneria lappella has a wingspan of 13–19 mm. The forewings are yellow with dull brown streaks. There is no definite pattern, but the brown colour is heaviest along the costa near the middle.

Biology
Adults are on wing in June and July in the north of North America and from April to August in the south. In England they fly in June and July. There is one generation per year (univoltine species). The larvae feed on the developing seeds of Arctium species, including Arctium lappa and Arctium minus.

The larvae have a translucent-whitish body and a brown-ochre head. Larvae can be found in late summer, fall, and spring. The species overwinters in the larval stage. Pupation takes place in the seedhead.

References

External links
 Lepiforum e. V.

Moths described in 1758
Taxa named by Carl Linnaeus
Metzneria
Moths of Japan
Moths of Europe